The men's 400 metres at the 2012 IAAF World Indoor Championships took place March 9 and 10 at the Ataköy Athletics Arena.  The final was won by Costa Rican Nery Brenes in a time of 45.11.

Doping disqualification
Rabah Yousif of Sudan, who ran the heat and the semifinal, retrospectively got his results disqualified for doping.

Medalists

Records

Qualification standards

Schedule

Results

Heats

Qualification: First 2 (Q) and the 6 fastest times qualified (q).  32 athletes from 27 countries participated.

Semifinals

Qualification: First 2 of each heat qualified (Q).  18 athletes from 14 countries participated.

Final

6 athletes from 5 countries participated.  The final started at 19:31.

References

400 metres
400 metres at the World Athletics Indoor Championships